Juhan (Johann) Kukk VR III/1 ( in Käru, Salla Parish (now in Väike-Maarja Parish), Wierland County, Governorate of Estonia – 4 December 1942 in Kargopol, Arkhangelsk Oblast, Soviet Union) was an Estonian politician.

Kukk finished the Tartu High School of Sciences, studied in the Commerce Department of the Riga Polytechnical School in 1904–1910 and got additional education in Germany, graduated with the diploma of first degree.

In 1917–1918 Kukk was head of the financial department of the Estonian Province Government (Maapäev), 1918–1919 Financial and State Property Minister of the Estonian Provisional Government, 1919–1920 Minister of Finance of the Republic of Estonia, 1920–1921 Minister of Commerce and Industry, from 18 November 1921 to 22 November 1922 Speaker of the I Riigikogu, 1922–1924 Director of the Bank of Estonia. He was member of the I and II Riigikogu, in 1920–1926. From November 1922 to August 1923 Kukk was Head of State.

Kukk was active promoter of the cooperative movement and also worked as chairman of the council of the Estonian Cooperation Union, Director of the Central Union of the Estonian Consumers Union, for some time also the chairman of the board of this union. From 1920 he was also chairman of the board of Rahvapank (People's Bank) and 1924–1926 director of Bank of Estonia.

Kukk was arrested by the NKVD in 1940, he died in imprisonment in 1942.

Awards
1920 - Cross of Liberty III/I

References
Juhan (Johann) Kukk
 Ülo Kaevats et al. 2000. Eesti entsüklopeedia 14. Tallinn: Eesti Entsüklopeediakirjastus, 

1885 births
1942 deaths
People from Väike-Maarja Parish
People from Kreis Wierland
Estonian Labour Party politicians
Heads of State of Estonia
Finance ministers of Estonia
Government ministers of Estonia
Members of the Estonian Provincial Assembly
Members of the Estonian Constituent Assembly
Members of the Riigikogu, 1920–1923
Members of the Riigikogu, 1923–1926
Speakers of the Riigikogu
Cooperative organizers
Riga Technical University alumni
Recipients of the Cross of Liberty (Estonia)
Estonian people who died in Soviet detention
People who died in the Gulag